Dilation (or dilatation) and curettage (D&C) refers to the dilation (widening/opening) of the cervix and surgical removal of part of the lining of the uterus and/or contents of the uterus by scraping and scooping (curettage). It is a gynecologic procedure used for diagnostic and therapeutic purposes, and is the most commonly used method for first-trimester miscarriage or abortion.

D&C normally refers to a procedure involving a curette, also called sharp curettage. However, some sources use the term D&C to refer to any procedure that involves the processes of dilation and removal of uterine contents, which includes the more common suction curettage procedures of manual and electric vacuum aspiration.

Clinical uses
D&Cs may be performed in pregnant and non-pregnant patients, for different clinical indications.

During pregnancy or postpartum 
A D&C may be performed early in pregnancy to remove pregnancy tissue, either in the case of a non-viable pregnancy, such as a missed or incomplete miscarriage, or an undesired pregnancy, as in a surgical abortion. Medical management of miscarriage and medical abortion using drugs such as misoprostol and mifepristone are safe, non-invasive and potentially less expensive alternatives to D&C.

Because medication-based non-invasive methods of abortion now exist, dilation and curettage has been declining as a method of abortion, although suction curettage is still the most common method used for termination of a first-trimester pregnancy. The World Health Organization recommends D&C with a sharp curette as a method of surgical abortion only when manual vacuum aspiration with a suction curette is unavailable.

For patients who have recently given birth, a D&C may be indicated to remove retained placental tissue that does not pass spontaneously or for postpartum hemorrhage.

Non-pregnant patients 

D&Cs for non-pregnant patients are commonly performed for the diagnosis of gynecological conditions leading to abnormal uterine bleeding; to remove the excess uterine lining in women who have conditions such as polycystic ovary syndrome; to remove tissue in the uterus that may be causing abnormal uterine bleeding, such as endometrial polyps or uterine fibroids; or to diagnose the cause of post-menopausal bleeding, such as in the case of endometrial cancer.

Hysteroscopy is a valid alternative or addition to D&C for many surgical indications, from diagnosis of uterine pathology to the removal of fibroids and even retained products of conception. It allows direct visualization of the inside of the uterus and may allow targeted sampling and removal of tissue inside the uterus.

Procedure
 Depending on the anticipated duration and difficulty expected with the procedure, as well as the clinical indication and patient preferences, a D&C may be performed with local anesthesia, moderate sedation, deep sedation, or general anesthesia. The first step in a D&C is to place a speculum in the vagina so as to see the cervix. Often, a tenaculum is placed to steady the cervix. Next, the provider will dilate the cervix. This can be done with Hegar or similar dilators. The amount of dilation depends on the amount of tissue to be removed as well as the size of the instruments to be used. After sufficient dilation, a curette, a metal rod with a handle on one end and a loop on the other, is then inserted into the uterus through the dilated cervix. The curette is used to gently scrape the lining of the uterus and remove the tissue in the uterus. If a suction curette is used, as in a vacuum aspiration, a plastic tubular curette will be introduced into the uterus and connected to suction to remove all tissue in the uterus. This tissue is examined for completeness (in the case of abortion or miscarriage treatment) or by pathology for abnormalities (in the case of treatment for abnormal bleeding).

Complications
The most common complications associated with D&C are infection, bleeding, or damage to nearby organs, including through uterine perforation. Aside from the surgery itself, complications related to anesthesia administration may also occur.

Infection is uncommon after D&C for a non-pregnant patient, and society practice guidelines do not recommend routine prophylactic antibiotics to patients. However, for curettage of a pregnant patient, the risk of infection is higher, and patients should receive antibiotics that cover the bacteria commonly found in the vagina and gastrointestinal tract; doxycycline is a common recommendation, though azithromycin may also be used.

Another risk of D&C is uterine perforation. The highest rate of uterine perforation appears to be in the setting of postpartum hemorrhage (5.1%) compared with a lower rate in diagnostic curettage in non-pregnant patients (0.3% in the premenopausal patient and 2.6% in the postmenopausal patient). Perforation may cause excessive bleeding or damage to organs outside the uterus. If the provider is concerned about ongoing bleeding or the possibility of injury to organs outside the uterus, a laparoscopy may be done to verify that there has been no undiagnosed injury.

Another risk is intrauterine adhesions, or Asherman's syndrome. One study found that in women who had one or two sharp curettage procedures for miscarriage, 14-16% developed some adhesions. Women who underwent three sharp curettage procedures for miscarriage had a 32% risk of developing adhesions. The risk of Asherman's syndrome was found to be 30.9% in women who had D&C following a missed miscarriage, and 25% in those who had a D&C 1–4 weeks postpartum. Untreated Asherman's syndrome, especially if severe, also increases the risk of complications in future pregnancies, such as ectopic pregnancy, miscarriage, and abnormal placentation (such as placenta previa and placenta accreta). According to recent case reports, use of vacuum aspiration can also lead to intrauterine adhesions. A systematic review in 2013 came to the conclusion that recurrent miscarriage and D&C are the main risk factors for intrauterine adhesions. However, that review also found no studies reporting a link between intrauterine adhesions and long-term reproductive outcome, and that similar pregnancy outcomes were reported subsequent to surgical management (including D&C), medical management or conservative management (that is, watchful waiting).

See also
 Dilation and evacuation
 Menstrual extraction
 Vacuum aspiration

References

External links
 Dilation and curettage (D&C) at Mayo Clinic
 

Gynaecology
Methods of abortion